Mahmoud Radwan (born 19 October 1989) is an Egyptian handball player for Al Ahly and the Egyptian national team.

References

1989 births
Living people
Egyptian male handball players
Competitors at the 2013 Mediterranean Games
Mediterranean Games gold medalists for Egypt
Mediterranean Games medalists in handball
21st-century Egyptian people